Vadim Arkadyevich Manzon (born 5 December 1994) is a Russian-Israeli football forward.

Club career
He made his debut in the Russian Second Division for FC Strogino Moscow on 15 July 2013 in a game against FC Torpedo Vladimir.

He made his Russian Football National League debut for FC Olimpiyets Nizhny Novgorod on 15 July 2017 in a game against PFC Krylia Sovetov Samara.

Mazon signed a three-year contract with Karlsruher SC on 25 July 2015.

Career statistics

References

External links
 Career summary by sportbox.ru  
 
 

1994 births
Living people
Footballers from Moscow
Russian Jews
Jewish footballers
Russian footballers
Russia youth international footballers
Russia under-21 international footballers
Russian expatriate footballers
2. Bundesliga players
Eliteserien players
Norwegian First Division players
Israeli Premier League players
Karlsruher SC players
FK Bodø/Glimt players
Hapoel Be'er Sheva F.C. players
FK Riteriai players
FC Khimki players
Expatriate footballers in Germany
Expatriate footballers in Norway
Expatriate footballers in Lithuania
Russian expatriate sportspeople in Germany
Russian expatriate sportspeople in Norway
Russian expatriate sportspeople in Lithuania
Association football forwards
FC Nizhny Novgorod (2015) players
PFC CSKA Moscow players
FC Strogino Moscow players